|- bgcolor="#FFFAFA"
| Note (category: variability): || H and K emission vary.

Arcturus is the brightest star in the northern constellation of Boötes. With an apparent visual magnitude of −0.05, it is the third-brightest of the individual stars in the night sky, and the brightest in the northern celestial hemisphere. The name Arcturus originated from ancient Greece; it was then cataloged as α Boötis by Johann Bayer in 1603, which is Latinized to Alpha Boötis. Arcturus forms one corner of the Spring Triangle asterism.

Located relatively close at 36.7 light-years from the Sun, Arcturus is a single red giant of spectral type K1.5III—an aging star around 7.1 billion years old that has used up its core hydrogen and evolved off the main sequence. It is about the same mass as the Sun, but has expanded to 25 times its size and is around 170 times as luminous. Its diameter is 35 million kilometres. Thus far no companion has been detected.

Nomenclature
The traditional name Arcturus is Latinised from the ancient Greek Ἀρκτοῦρος (Arktouros) and means "Guardian of the Bear", ultimately from ἄρκτος (arktos), "bear" and οὖρος (ouros), "watcher, guardian". 

The designation of Arcturus as α Boötis (Latinised to Alpha Boötis) was made by Johann Bayer in 1603. In 2016, the International Astronomical Union organized a Working Group on Star Names (WGSN) to catalog and standardize proper names for stars. The WGSN's first bulletin of July 2016 included a table of the first two batches of names approved by the WGSN; which included Arcturus for α Boötis.

Observation

With an apparent visual magnitude of −0.05, Arcturus is the brightest star in the northern celestial hemisphere and the fourth-brightest star in the night sky, after Sirius (−1.46 apparent magnitude), Canopus (−0.72) and α Centauri (combined magnitude of −0.27). However, α Centauri AB is a binary star, whose components are both fainter than Arcturus. This makes Arcturus the third-brightest individual star, just ahead of α Centauri A (officially named Rigil Kentaurus), whose apparent magnitude . The French mathematician and astronomer Jean-Baptiste Morin observed Arcturus in the daytime with a telescope in 1635, a first for any star other than the Sun and supernovae. Arcturus has been seen at or just before sunset with the naked eye.

Arcturus is visible from both of Earth's hemispheres as it is located 19° north of the celestial equator. The star culminates at midnight on 27 April, and at 9 p.m. on June 10 being visible during the late northern spring or the southern autumn. From the northern hemisphere, an easy way to find Arcturus is to follow the arc of the handle of the Big Dipper (or Plough). By continuing in this path, one can find Spica, "Arc to Arcturus, then spike (or speed on) to Spica". Together with the bright stars Spica and Denebola (or Regulus, depending on the source), Arcturus is part of the Spring Triangle asterism. With Cor Caroli, these four stars form the Great Diamond asterism.

Ptolemy described Arcturus as subrufa ("slightly red"): it has a B-V color index of +1.23, roughly midway between Pollux (B-V +1.00) and Aldebaran (B-V +1.54).

η Boötis, or Muphrid, is only 3.3 light-years distant from Arcturus, and would have a visual magnitude −2.5, about as bright as Mercury from Earth, whereas an observer on the former system would find Arcturus as bright as Venus as seen from Earth.

In 1984, the 90 cm (36-inch) reflecting Yapp telescope at Herstmonceux was tested with an echelle spectrograph from Queen's University Belfast and a CCD camera. Observations of the stars Arcturus and Deneb (Alpha Cygni) were conducted in the summer of 1984.

Physical characteristics

The parallax margin of error is 0.54 milliarcseconds, translating to a distance margin of error of ±. Because of its proximity, Arcturus has a high proper motion, two arcseconds a year, greater than any first magnitude star other than α Centauri.

Arcturus is moving rapidly relative to the Sun, and is now almost at its closest point to the Sun. Closest approach will happen in about 4,000 years, when the star will be a few hundredths of a light-year closer to Earth than it is today. (In antiquity, Arcturus was closer to the centre of the constellation.) Arcturus is thought to be an old-disk star, and appears to be moving with a group of 52 other such stars, known as the Arcturus stream.

With an absolute magnitude of −0.30, Arcturus is, together with Vega and Sirius, one of the most luminous stars in the Sun's neighborhood. It is about 110 times brighter than the Sun in visible light wavelengths, but this underestimates its strength as much of the light it gives off is in the infrared; total (bolometric) power output is about 180 times that of the Sun. With a near-infrared J band magnitude of −2.2, only Betelgeuse (−2.9) and R Doradus (−2.6) are brighter. The lower output in visible light is due to a lower efficacy as the star has a lower surface temperature than the Sun.

As a single star, the mass of Arcturus cannot be measured directly, but models suggest it is slightly greater than that of the Sun. The star displays magnetic activity that is heating the coronal structures, and it undergoes a solar-type magnetic cycle with a duration that is probably less than 14 years. A weak magnetic field has been detected in the photosphere with a strength of around half a gauss. The magnetic activity appears to lie along four latitudes and is rotationally modulated.

Arcturus is estimated to be around 6 to 8.5 billion years old, but there is some uncertainty about its evolutionary status. Based upon the color characteristics of Arcturus, it is currently ascending the red-giant branch and will continue to do so until it accumulates a large enough degenerate helium core to ignite the helium flash. It has likely exhausted the hydrogen from its core and is now in its active hydrogen shell burning phase. However, Charbonnel et al. (1998) placed it slightly above the horizontal branch, and suggested it has already completed the helium flash stage.

Spectrum
Originally an F-type main sequence star, Arcturus has evolved off the main sequence to the red giant branch, reaching an early K-type stellar classification. It is frequently assigned the spectral type of K0III, but in 1989 was used as the spectral standard for type K1.5III Fe−0.5, with the suffix notation indicating a mild underabundance of iron compared to typical stars of its type. As the brightest K-type giant in the sky, it has been the subject of multiple atlases with coverage from the ultraviolet to infrared.

The spectrum shows a dramatic transition from emission lines in the ultraviolet to atomic absorption lines in the visible range and molecular absorption lines in the infrared. This is due to the optical depth of the atmosphere varying with wavelength. The spectrum shows very strong absorption in some molecular lines that are not produced in the photosphere but in a surrounding shell. Examination of carbon monoxide lines show the molecular component of the atmosphere extending outward to 2–3 times the radius of the star, with the chromospheric wind steeply accelerating to 35–40 km/s in this region.

Astronomers term "metals" those elements with higher atomic numbers than helium. The atmosphere of Arcturus has an enrichment of alpha elements relative to iron but only about a third of solar metallicity. Arcturus is possibly a Population II star.

Oscillations
As one of the brightest stars in the sky, Arcturus has been the subject of a number of studies in the emerging field of asteroseismology. Belmonte and colleagues carried out a radial velocity (Doppler shift of spectral lines) study of the star in April and May 1988, which showed variability with a frequency of the order of a few microhertz (μHz), the highest peak corresponding to 4.3 μHz (2.7 days) with an amplitude of 60 ms−1, with a frequency separation of c. 5 μHz. They suggested that the most plausible explanation for the variability of Arcturus is stellar oscillations.

This form of modelling is still relatively inaccurate, but a useful check on other models.

Possible planetary system
Hipparcos satellite astrometry suggested that Arcturus is a binary star, with the companion about twenty times dimmer than the primary and orbiting close enough to be at the very limits of humans' current ability to make it out. Recent results remain inconclusive, but do support the marginal Hipparcos detection of a binary companion.

In 1993, radial velocity measurements of Aldebaran, Arcturus and Pollux showed that Arcturus exhibited a long-period radial velocity oscillation, which could be interpreted as a substellar companion. This substellar object would be nearly 12 times the mass of Jupiter and be located roughly at the same orbital distance from Arcturus as the Earth is from the Sun, at 1.1 astronomical units. However, all three stars surveyed showed similar oscillations yielding similar companion masses, and the authors concluded that the variation was likely to be intrinsic to the star rather than due to the gravitational effect of a companion. So far no substellar companion has been confirmed.

Mythology

One astronomical tradition associates Arcturus with the mythology around Arcas, who was about to shoot and kill his own mother Callisto who had been transformed into a bear. Zeus averted their imminent tragic fate by transforming the boy into the constellation Boötes, called Arctophylax "bear guardian" by the Greeks, and his mother into Ursa Major (Greek: Arctos "the bear"). The account is given in Hyginus's Astronomy.

Aratus in his Phaenomena said that the star Arcturus lay below the belt of Arctophylax, and according to Ptolemy in the Almagest it lay between his thighs.

An alternative lore associates the name with the legend around Icarius, who gave the gift of wine to other men, but was murdered by them, because they had had no experience with intoxication and mistook the wine for poison. It is stated this Icarius, became Arcturus, while his dog, Maira, became Canicula (Procyon), although "Arcturus" here may be used in the sense of the constellation rather than the star.

Cultural significance
As one of the brightest stars in the sky, Arcturus has been significant to observers since antiquity.

In ancient Mesopotamia, it was linked to the god Enlil, and also known as Shudun, "yoke", or SHU-PA of unknown derivation in the Three Stars Each Babylonian star catalogues and later MUL.APIN around 1100 BC.

In ancient Greek the star is found in ancient astronomical literature, e.g. Hesiod's Work and Days, circa 700 BC, as well as Hipparchus's and Ptolemy's star catalogs. The folk-etymology connecting the star name with the bears (Greek: ἄρκτος, arktos) was probably invented much later. It fell out of use in favour of Arabic names until it was revived in the Renaissance.

In Arabic, Arcturus is one of two stars called al-simāk "the uplifted ones" (the other is Spica). Arcturus is specified as السماك الرامح as-simāk ar-rāmiħ "the uplifted one of the lancer". The term Al Simak Al Ramih has appeared in Al Achsasi Al Mouakket catalogue (translated into Latin as Al Simak Lanceator). This has been variously romanized in the past, leading to obsolete variants such as Aramec and Azimech. For example, the name Alramih is used in Geoffrey Chaucer's A Treatise on the Astrolabe (1391). Another Arabic name is Haris-el-sema, from حارس السماء ħāris al-samā’ "the keeper of heaven". or حارس الشمال ħāris al-shamāl’ "the keeper of north".

In Indian astronomy, Arcturus is called Swati or Svati (Devanagari स्वाति, Transliteration IAST svāti, svātī́), possibly 'su' + 'ati' ("great goer", in reference to its remoteness) meaning very beneficent. It has been referred to as "the real pearl" in Bhartṛhari's kāvyas. 

In Chinese astronomy, Arcturus is called Da Jiao, because it is the brightest star in the Chinese constellation called Jiao Xiu. Later it became a part of another constellation Kang Xiu.

The Wotjobaluk Koori people of southeastern Australia knew Arcturus as Marpean-kurrk, mother of Djuit (Antares) and another star in Boötes, Weet-kurrk (Muphrid). Its appearance in the north signified the arrival of the larvae of the wood ant (a food item) in spring. The beginning of summer was marked by the star's setting with the Sun in the west and the disappearance of the larvae. The people of Milingimbi Island in Arnhem Land saw Arcturus and Muphrid as man and woman, and took the appearance of Arcturus at sunrise as a sign to go and harvest rakia or spikerush. The Weilwan of northern New South Wales knew Arcturus as Guembila "red".

Prehistoric Polynesian navigators knew Arcturus as Hōkūleʻa, the "Star of Joy". Arcturus is the zenith star of the Hawaiian Islands. Using Hōkūleʻa and other stars, the Polynesians launched their double-hulled canoes from Tahiti and the Marquesas Islands. Traveling east and north they eventually crossed the equator and reached the latitude at which Arcturus would appear directly overhead in the summer night sky. Knowing they had arrived at the exact latitude of the island chain, they sailed due west on the trade winds to landfall. If Hōkūleʻa could be kept directly overhead, they landed on the southeastern shores of the Big Island of Hawaii. For a return trip to Tahiti the navigators could use Sirius, the zenith star of that island. Since 1976, the Polynesian Voyaging Society's Hōkūleʻa has crossed the Pacific Ocean many times under navigators who have incorporated this wayfinding technique in their non-instrument navigation.

Arcturus had several other names that described its significance to indigenous Polynesians. In the Society Islands, Arcturus, called Ana-tahua-taata-metua-te-tupu-mavae ("a pillar to stand by"), was one of the ten "pillars of the sky", bright stars that represented the ten heavens of the Tahitian afterlife. In Hawaii, the pattern of Boötes was called Hoku-iwa, meaning "stars of the frigatebird". This constellation marked the path for Hawaiʻiloa on his return to Hawaii from the South Pacific Ocean. The Hawaiians called Arcturus Hoku-leʻa. It was equated to the Tuamotuan constellation Te Kiva, meaning "frigatebird", which could either represent the figure of Boötes or just Arcturus. However, Arcturus may instead be the Tuamotuan star called Turu. The Hawaiian name for Arcturus as a single star was likely Hoku-leʻa, which means "star of gladness", or "clear star". In the Marquesas Islands, Arcturus was probably called Tau-tou and was the star that ruled the month approximating January. The Māori and Moriori called it Tautoru, a variant of the Marquesan name and a name shared with Orion's Belt.

In Inuit astronomy, Arcturus is called the Old Man (Uttuqalualuk in Inuit languages) and The First Ones (Sivulliik in Inuit languages).

The Miꞌkmaq of eastern Canada saw Arcturus as Kookoogwéss, the owl.

Early-20th-century Armenian scientist Nazaret Daghavarian theorized that the star commonly referred to in Armenian folklore as Gutani astgh (Armenian: Գութանի աստղ; lit. star of the plow) was in fact Arcturus, as the constellation of Boötes was called "Ezogh" (Armenian: Եզող; lit. the person who is plowing) by Armenians.

In popular culture

In Ancient Rome, the star's celestial activity was supposed to portend tempestuous weather, and a personification of the star acts as narrator of the prologue to Plautus' comedy Rudens (circa 211 BC).

The Karandavyuha sutra, compiled at the end of the 4th century or beginning of the 5th century, names one of Avalokiteśvara's meditative absorptions as "The face of Arcturus".

One of the possible etymologies offered for the name "Arthur" assumes that it is derived from "Arcturus" and that the late 5th to early 6th-century figure on whom the myth of King Arthur is based was originally named for the star.

In the Middle Ages, Arcturus was considered a Behenian fixed star and attributed to the stone Jasper and the plantain herb. Cornelius Agrippa listed its kabbalistic sign  under the alternate name Alchameth.

Arcturus's light was employed in the mechanism used to open the 1933 Chicago World's Fair. The star was chosen as it was thought that light from Arcturus had started its journey at about the time of the previous Chicago World's Fair in 1893 (at 36.7 light-years away, the light actually started in 1896).

At the height of the American Civil War, President Abraham Lincoln observed Arcturus through a 9.6-inch refractor telescope when he visited the Naval Observatory in Washington, DC, in August, 1863.

References

Further reading

</ref>

External links

 SolStation.com entry

K-type giants
Suspected variables
Hypothetical planetary systems
Arcturus moving group

Boötes
Bootis, Alpha
BD+19 2777
Bootis, 16
0541
124897
069673
5340
Stars named from the Ancient Greek language
TIC objects